Bonnetia ptariensis is a species of flowering plant in the Bonnetiaceae family. It is found only in Venezuela.

References

ptariensis
Endemic flora of Venezuela
Guayana Highlands
Critically endangered flora of South America
Taxonomy articles created by Polbot